The 1935 Army Cadets football team represented the United States Military Academy in the 1935 college football season. In their third year under head coach Garrison H. Davidson, the Cadets compiled a  record, shut out four of their nine opponents, and outscored all opponents by a combined total of 176 to 62.
 
Two Army players were recognized on the All-America team. End William R. Shuler received first-team honors from the Associated Press (AP). Halfback Charles R. Meyer received second-team honors from the United Press (UP) and North American Newspaper Alliance.

Schedule

References

Army
Army Black Knights football seasons
Army Cadets football